The 2007 Allan Cup was the Canadian senior ice hockey championship for the 2006–07 senior "AAA" season.  The event was hosted by the Stony Plain Eagles in Stony Plain, Alberta.  The 2007 tournament marked the 99th year that the Allan Cup has been awarded.

Teams
Bentley Generals (Pacific)
Halifax Molson Canadians (Atlantic)
Lloydminster Border Kings (West)
Shawinigan Xtreme (Quebec)
Stony Plain Eagles (Host)
Whitby Dunlops (Ontario)

Results
Round Robin
Bentley Generals 4 - Lloydminster Border Kings 1
Whitby Dunlops 3 - Stony Plain Eagles 3
Bentley Generals 5 - Halifax Molson Canadians 3
Whitby Dunlops 6 - Shawinigan Xtreme 5
Lloydminster Border Kings 5 - Halifax Molson Canadians 4
Stony Plain Eagles 4 - Shawinigan Xtreme 3 (OT)
Quarter-final
Whitby Dunlops 9 - Halifax Molson Canadians 5
Lloydminster Border Kings 5 - Shawinigan Xtreme 1
Semi-final
Whitby Dunlops 3 - Bentley Generals 2 (OT)
Lloydminster Border Kings 5 - Stony Plain Eagles 4
Final
Lloydminster Border Kings 4 - Whitby Dunlops 3

External links
2007 Allan Cup website
Allan Cup website 

Allan
Allan Cup